Kaung Myat San (born 14 December 1993) is a Burmese television and film actor and model. He is best known for his roles in television series. Yadanar Htae Ka Yadanar (2017), A Mone Mha The (2017), Closest to the Heart (2018), Where There is Love (2019) and The Missing Truth (2019).

Early life and education
Kaung Myat San was born on September 6, 1993 in Yangon, Myanmar to parent Thein San and Mar Mar Nyo. He attended at Basic Education High School No. 2 Mandalay. He graduated with a degree B.A English from Yadanabon University.

Career
In 2012, he arrived to Yangon and he participated in King of Denim 2012 Contest. He also competed in the MRTV-4's competition for the new cast for The Sign of Love series and he was selected. Then he starred in his debut MRTV-4 drama series The Sign of Love alongside Myat Thu Kyaw, Soe Nandar Kyaw, Wint Yamone Naing, Hsaung Wutyee May and May Myint Mo.

In 2017, he starred in drama series Yadanar Htae Ka Yadanar alongside Aung Min Khant and Myat Thu Thu. In the same year, he starred in drama series A Mone Mha The alongside Kyaw Htet Zaw and Hsaung Wutyee May. In 2018, he starred in drama series Closest to the Heart alongside Nan Sandar Hla Htun.

In 2019, he starred in drama series Where There is Love alongside Hsaung Wutyee May. In the same year, he starred in thriller drama series The Missing Truth alongside Lu Min, May Myint Mo and Naw Phaw Eh Htar.

Filmography

Film (Cinema)
Yoma Paw Kya Tae Myet Yay  (2019)
Shwe Phu Sar

Television series
 The Sign of Love (2012)
 The Sign of Love : Season 2 (2012)
 The Sign of Love : Season 3 (2013)
 Happy Beach : Season 1 (Ep.18 Guest) (2013)
 Eain Nee Chin (2015)
 Yadanar Htae Ka Yadanar (2017)
 A Mone Mha The (2017)
 Closest to the Heart (2018)
 Where There is Love (2019)
 The Missing Truth (2019)
 Ywar Lal Tae Phu Sar (2022)
 101% Love (2022)

References

External links

 

Living people
1993 births
Burmese male models
Burmese male film actors
21st-century Burmese male actors
People from Mandalay